Da'Mon Jonnel Cromartie-Smith (born February 17, 1987) is a safety who is currently a free agent. He was originally signed by the Pittsburgh Steelers as an undrafted free agent in 2010. He played college football for the University of Texas at El Paso.

College career
He played college football at Texas-El Paso.

Professional career

Pittsburgh Steelers
After going undrafted in the 2010 NFL Draft, he signed with the Pittsburgh Steelers.

On December 8, 2011, he made his season debut against the Cleveland Browns. He only recorded one tackle in that game.

On August 31, 2012, he was released.

Washington Redskins
Cromartie-Smith signed with the Washington Redskins on August 9, 2014. He was released during final cuts on August 29, 2014.

On January 2, 2015, the Redskins signed Cromartie-Smith to a futures contract. On September 5, he was waived with an injury settlement for final roster cuts before the start of the regular season.

Personal life
Cromartie-Smith is the younger brother of retired NFL fullback, Terrelle Smith. On an edition of “The Steel Crew” Podcast, Da’Mon revealed he is not related to former NFL defensive backs Antonio Cromartie, Dominique Rodgers-Cromartie, and Marcus Cromartie.

References

External links
UTEP Miners football bio
Pittsburgh Steelers bio

1987 births
Living people
Players of American football from Riverside, California
American football safeties
UTEP Miners football players
Pittsburgh Steelers players
Sacramento Mountain Lions players
American sportspeople of Haitian descent
Washington Redskins players